Sanny or Sannie is a given name, nickname and surname. It may refer to:

Given name
 Sanny Åslund (born 1952), Swedish football coach and former player
 Sannie Carlson (born 1970), stage name Whigfield, Danish singer, songwriter, record producer and actress
 Sanny Dahlbeck (born 1991), Swedish welterweight kickboxer
 Sanny van Heteren (born 1977), German actress
 Sanny Lindström (born 1979), former Swedish Hockey League player
 Sanny Monteiro (born 1989), Dutch former footballer
 Sannie Overly (born 1966), American lawyer, engineer and politician 
 Sanny Weitner, Dutch contestant in the Miss World 1952 beauty pageant

Nickname
 Frank Jacobsson (1930–2017), Swedish footballer
 Alex Dick (1894–1958), Scottish footballer
 Alex McAnespie, Scottish former football player (1964–1978) and manager (1987–1996)
 Michael "Sanny" Santangelo, a character on The Wire

Surname
 Charles Sannié, who held the Chair for Chemistry as Applied to Organic Compounds from 1941 to 1957 - see List of Chairs of the Muséum national d'histoire naturelle
 Lorne Sanny (1920–2005), President of The Navigators Christian para-church organization after the death of founder Dawson Trotman
 Mohammed Sannie (born 1986), Ghanaian football goalkeeper
 Omar Sanny, footballer in Israel - see List of 2007–08 Israeli football transfers

See also
 Sanny, Australian slang for hand sanitizer 
 Sannies, a Scottish name for Plimsoll shoes
 "The sanny", local nickname for Holloway Sanatorium, near Virginia Water, Surrey, England

Lists of people by nickname